Didier Boulaud (born 4 September 1950, Yzeure) is a former member of the Senate of France. He represented the Nièvre department as a member of the Socialist Party.

Boulaud was first elected to the Senate on 23 September 2001. He was re-elected on 24 September 2011. He resigned his seat on 30 September 2012.

References
Page on the Senate website

1950 births
People from Allier
Living people
Socialist Party (France) politicians
French Senators of the Fifth Republic
Chevaliers of the Légion d'honneur
Senators of Nièvre